Frankish language can refer to:

Frankish language, the language spoken by the Franks, a Germanic people active in the Roman era
The Low Franconian languages, the linguistic subgroup containing modern variants of the Old Frankish language: Dutch and Afrikaans
any Franconian German variety
a West Franconian dialect of modern German spoken in Alsace and Lorraine (Lorraine Franconian), regions in France

de:Lothringisch
ja:フランク語